Afshin Moghaddam (30 September 1945 – 23 July 1976), born Hossein Ahanian Moghaddam, was an Iranian singer.

He was best known for his song "Zemestoun (Winter)", which came 79th in Manoto 1's "100 Greatest Iranian Songs of All-Time" chart.

Moghaddam was killed in a car accident whilst traveling to Amol, north of Iran, with three friends. All but Moghaddam survived, who later died on the way to the hospital.

Discography

Studio albums
Zemestoon: Best of Afshin (2002, Caltex Records)

References 

1945 births
1976 deaths
People from Tehran
Iranian pop singers
Iranian male singers
Burials at Behesht-e Zahra
Road incident deaths in Iran
20th-century Iranian male singers